Teklovka is a rural locality (a village) in Chernushinsky District, Perm Krai, Russia. The population was 68 as of 2010. There are 3 streets.

Geography 
Teklovka is located 33 km southeast of Chernushka (the district's administrative centre) by road. Ivanovka is the nearest rural locality.

References 

Rural localities in Chernushinsky District